Crusade is an American spin-off television series from J. Michael Straczynski's Babylon 5, released in 1999. It is set in 2267, five years after the events of Babylon 5, and just after the movie A Call to Arms. The Drakh have released a nanovirus plague on Earth, which will destroy all life on Earth within five years if it is not stopped. The Victory class destroyer Excalibur has been sent out to look for anything that could help the search for a cure.

Production background 
Like Babylon 5, Crusade was intended to have a five-year story arc, although as Straczynski notes in the DVD commentary for A Call to Arms, it was intended to resolve the Drakh plague after a season or two and move onto other storylines. Conflicts arose, however, between the producers and executives at TNT, and production was cancelled before the first episode was broadcast.

TNT's research had indicated that the audience for Babylon 5 did not watch other TNT programming, and likewise TNT's main audience was not watching the show, making another related program unattractive to the network's management. Straczynski believes that the network's "interference" with the production was an attempt to get out of their contract by allowing them to argue that he failed to deliver the series they wanted.

Thirteen episodes were made and broadcast by TNT, with at least four more scripted. The Sci-Fi Channel attempted to pick up the show and continue production, but was unable to find room in its budget.

Plot background

Drakh attack 

In 2267, six years after the end of the Shadow War, the Drakh, a former ally of the Shadows, attempt to destroy the Earth with a leftover Shadow Planet Killer. Interstellar Alliance (ISA) president John Sheridan takes command of Excalibur and Victory and leads the EarthForce and ISA fleets to victory. During the battle, the Drakh release a viral weapon into Earth's atmosphere, infecting every living thing on the planet. In five years, the virus will become active and kill everything. The Victory is destroyed in the battle, but the  Excalibur survives. Command is turned over to Captain Matthew Gideon who is given a mission: explore the galaxy to find either a cure, or an ally capable of producing one ("War Zone").

Telepath War 

At some point between 2262 and 2267 (most likely in 2264, and just before Babylon 5: The Legend of the Rangers, which took place in 2265), a civil war broke out on Earth between the Psi Corps and a group of rogue telepaths, with mundanes (non-telepaths) caught in the middle. As a result of the war, the Psi Corps (which all telepaths had been forced by law to join) was disbanded and the laws were rewritten; telepaths were given limited rights and allowed back into society, including the military (e.g. Lt. Matheson in Crusade). Few telepaths have advanced very far because of how recent the war was and due to the common fear of telepaths. Telepaths are still banned from scanning others' thoughts without consent and are required to be "deep scanned" by powerful telepaths on a regular basis to ensure that they are not violating any laws ("The Well of Forever").

Mars independence 
After the Earth Alliance Civil War in 2261, Earth joined the ISA. As promised by John Sheridan, Mars was granted independence since ISA laws required members to free any colony where the majority of colonists want independence ("Rising Star"). There is still resentment between the two sides ("Ruling from the Tomb"). Earth controls most of the information systems and resources in the solar system and Earth-based corporations control much of the Mars economy ("Objects in Motion"). As a result, there is some hostility among Mars-born humans towards Terrans and many in EarthForce do not feel obligated to risk their lives to help Earth fight the plague.

Shadow technology 
The galaxy is dealing with the Shadow technology legacy, which, among other things, includes the release of the plague on Earth by the Drakh, which is made out of Shadow technology and Earthforce's use of it, which Gideon had to experience tragically ten years before.

Cast 

This is a list of season star cast members, as credited on the DVDs.
 Gary Cole as Captain Matthew Gideon: captain of Excalibur. He was specifically chosen by Interstellar Alliance president John Sheridan because he would be willing to take chances and would not let diplomacy get in the way of completing the mission.
 Tracy Scoggins as Captain Elizabeth Lochley: commanding officer of Babylon 5. She first encountered Gideon on Mars during an interstellar conference on the plague where she was heading security ("Ruling from the Tomb"). She and Gideon originally clashed due to similarities in personalities, but soon developed a relationship as casual lovers, ("The Rules of the Game"). She returned to Babylon 5 after the conference and appeared on a recurring basis.
 Daniel Dae Kim as Lieutenant John Matheson: second in command and P6 telepath (slightly stronger than a Commercial Telepath (P5)). He is considered to be a role model among human telepaths since no other has advanced so far in the EarthForce military. He served as Gideon's first officer on his previous assignment as well. He was assigned to Excalibur at the insistence of Gideon.
 David Allen Brooks as Max Eilerson: a successful archaeologist from Interplanetary Expeditions. He was a child prodigy and has a gift for understanding alien languages. He was not originally assigned to Excalibur but was recruited by Gideon during their encounter in "War Zone".
 Peter Woodward as Galen: a technomage, who had saved Gideon's life 10 years prior to the series ("The Path of Sorrows"). He was exiled from the technomages' order  in 2267 after he helped Earth and the ISA fight the Drakh in the battle that resulted in Earth becoming infected with the plague (Babylon 5: A Call to Arms).
 Marjean Holden as Doctor Sarah Chambers: ship's medical officer. She was on Mars at the time of the Drakh attack and was willing to risk the plague to go home to Earth and be with her family and help, but was persuaded that her medical expertise could be put to better use by helping to find a cure.
 Carrie Dobro as Dureena Nafeel: a thief and last known survivor of her race (which was destroyed by the Drakh during the Shadow War). Along with Galen, she assisted the crew during the Drakh attack on Earth. After the attack she was held on Mars by EarthForce for further questioning, but was released when Gideon made her part of the crew.

Episodes 
The "correct" order of episodes is somewhat unclear and the episodes contain conflicting evidence as to the in-universe chronological order. Series creator J. Michael Straczynski revised TNT's ordering for re-broadcast on the Sci Fi Channel in April 2001 and the episodes have been repeated in this order a number of occasions since then. "War Zone," an episode made halfway through the production as an opener, has been pushed near the end. In particular, these episodes ignore a discontinuity in uniforms – in the TNT order, the crew start out with the revised uniforms in production, and then in "Appearances and Other Deceits" were forced to change to the "new" uniforms used earlier in production. The fourteenth episode would have featured a return to the older uniforms that the crew prefer.

A third order was formally endorsed by Straczynski as the "true" chronological sequence of in-universe events for the filmed episodes, as it appeared in The Official Babylon 5 Chronology (published in the pages of The Official Babylon 5 Magazine in 1999-2000) and the book Across Time and Space: The Chronologies of Babylon 5. Here, "Babylon 5 Historical Database" author Terry Jones explains the running order was done to take into account Straczynski's desire to have the grey bellhop uniform stories incorporated within the black explorer uniform stories and the internal story continuity had the series continued. This also accounted for the various on-air dates given and the changes made to dialogue in "Each Night I Dream of Home". This particular ordering supersedes Straczynski's own "preferred" sequence from a strictly chronological and causal standpoint. The original broadcast order as set by TNT was used for the DVD releases.

A fourth, continuity-based order can be inferred by the events of the episodes themselves as several of the episodes make mini-arcs within the series; i.e. the continuity order of Gideon/Lochley meetings based on dialog is "Ruling from the Tomb"/"Each Night I Dream of Home"/"The Rules of the Game" which also requires "Ruling" to precede "Appearances and Other Deceits" while the continuity order of the nanite mask is "The Memory of War"/"Each Night I Dream of Home"/"Patterns of the Soul," etc.

Episode list

Unfilmed episodes
When production was suspended, planning for the episodes that would have made up the second half of the season was at various stages: three had completed scripts and a number of others were ready for scripting with titles and story outlines.

The completed scripts of "To The Ends of the Earth", "Value Judgements", and "End of the Line" were published online for a period during 2001 on bookface.com.

A script written by Peter Galen for the second season entitled Little Bugs Have Lesser Bugs was published in 2011 as part of the Other Voices Volume 1 collection. Scripts for three further episodes, Value Judgments, Tried and True, and War Story were included in Other Voices Volume 2, also published in 2011.

Home releases 
The complete series was released as a four-disc set in 2004, almost five years after the series ended and a few months after the final season and movie set of Babylon 5 was released. Crusade was also included in Babylon 5: The Complete Universe, a set of all B5 shows and movies released in the United Kingdom on October 24, 2005. It was not included in Babylon 5: The Complete Television Series, which was a set released in the United States.

The episodes are in the original broadcast order. The set does not include the pilot movie, A Call to Arms, which was released earlier as part of the movie set. Unlike Babylon 5, the DVD release of Crusade was not cropped and re-edited for widescreen; it maintains its original fullscreen format. Initially, the set included a commentary with Straczynski, however he got it removed from subsequent pressings when he learned that parts of it had been replaced with an entirely different interview to cover up his harsh criticism of TNT.

References

External links 

 
 Apocalypse Box Site

 
1990s American science fiction television series
Post-apocalyptic television series
Serial drama television series
1999 American television series debuts
1999 American television series endings
American television spin-offs
TNT (American TV network) original programming
Space adventure television series
English-language television shows
Television series set in the 23rd century
Television series by Warner Bros. Television Studios
Television series created by J. Michael Straczynski
Television shows filmed in Los Angeles
Television series set on fictional planets
Artificial wormholes in fiction